Peter Ravn may refer to:

Peter Ravn (artist) (born 1955), Danish painter
Peter Ravn (speedway rider) (born 1962), Danish motorcycle speedway rider